The 2013 North Carolina A&T Aggies football team represented North Carolina A&T State University as a member of Mid-Eastern Athletic Conference (MEAC) during the 2013 NCAA Division I FCS football season. Led by third-year head coach Rod Broadway, the Aggies compiled an overall record of 7–4 with a mark of 4–4 in conference play, placing in a three-way tie for fifth in the MEAC. North Carolina A&T played home games at Aggie Stadium in Greensboro, North Carolina.

The Aggies entered the 2013 season having been picked to finish second in the conference at MEAC Media Day. The team also had a new offensive coordinator, Rickey Bustle.

Schedule

*Game aired on ESPNU on a tape delayed basis

Coaching staff

Game summaries

Appalachian State

This game marked the 21st meeting overall between the Shaw University Bears and the Aggies, and the first between the two in 52 Years. Going into the  match up, the Aggies held the all-time series at 3-17-1. The last meeting between the two in 1968, saw The Aggies defeat the Bears 0-69.

The Aggies called upon redshirt freshman quarterback Lamar Raynard to be the starting quarterback. Raynard passed for 188 yards with three touchdowns and 1 interception.  Preseason All-American & MEAC Offensive player of the year, running back Tarik Cohen, ran for 106 yards and two touchdowns on 21 carries. This game marked Cohen's 13th career 100-yard game. Cohen is now 928 rushing yards short of becoming the all-time leading rusher in school history.

2014 NFL draft
The 2014 NFL Draft was held on May 8–10, 2013 at Radio City Music Hall in New York City. The following A&T players were either selected or signed as undrafted free agents following the draft.

References

North Carolina AandT
North Carolina A&T Aggies football seasons